The PNC Bank Building is a high-rise office building located in the Market West neighborhood of Center City, Philadelphia. Constructed in 1983, it is 491 feet (150 m) in height and has 39 stories. It houses offices for PNC Financial Services. It was constructed on the site of the Fox Theatre and the Stanley/Stanton/Milgram Theatre.

It is home to a number of businesses, including Cohen Seglias Pallas Greenhall & Furman, PC, Huntington & Franklin, P.C., Philadelphia office of Schnader Harrison Segal & Lewis, Zarella Law Office LLC, Stifel Nicolaus Weisel's Investment Banking group, BCD m&i., and the Tax Warriors of Drucker & Scaccetti, P.C.

Site 
The PNC Bank Building is located at 1600 Market Street in the Market West neighborhood of Center City, Philadelphia. It occupies the northeast corner of a city block bounded by Market Street to the north, 16th Street to the east, Chestnut Street to the south, and 17th Street to the west.

The building shares the city block with the Liberty Place skyscraper complex, with One Liberty Place to the west, Two Liberty Place to the south, and the Shops at Liberty Place to the southwest. Other nearby buildings include Centre Square to the east, One Penn Center to the north, and the BNY Mellon Center to the northwest.

History

Provident Mutual Life Insurance Co. was a former tenant of the building. In 1996, the New York-based real estate investment management firm Yarmouth Group oversaw a renovation for the new owners of the building purchased two years before.

PNC Bank formally moved its regional headquarters and PNC Asset Management Group national headquarters to the 1600 Market Street building in 1997, occupying 15 floors.

See also

List of tallest buildings in Philadelphia

References

Skyscraper office buildings in Philadelphia
Bank buildings in Pennsylvania

Skidmore, Owings & Merrill buildings
Office buildings completed in 1983